Thomas Dau (born 9 August 1991) is an Austrian footballer who plays for ASK Mannersdorf.

References

External links
Thomas Dau at ÖFB

1991 births
Living people
Austrian footballers
Austrian expatriate footballers
Association football goalkeepers
First Vienna FC players
SK Rapid Wien players
SV Schwechat players
Aston Villa F.C. players
SV Mattersburg players
SV Horn players
SpVgg Unterhaching players
People from Neusiedl am See District
Footballers from Burgenland
Austrian expatriate sportspeople in England
Austrian expatriate sportspeople in Germany
Expatriate footballers in England
Expatriate footballers in Germany